Khatta Meetha is a 2010 Indian Hindi-language political satire comedy film written and directed by Priyadarshan and produced by Hari Om Entertainment. A remake of Priyadarshan's previous 1988 Malayalam film Vellanakalude Nadu (1988), scripted by Sreenivasan, the film stars Akshay Kumar and Trisha (in her Bollywood debut), while Kulbhushan Kharbanda, Rajpal Yadav, Asrani, Johnny Lever, Aruna Irani, Urvashi Sharma, Makarand Deshpande, Jaideep Ahlawat, Manoj Joshi, Milind Gunaji and Neeraj Vora feature in supporting roles. 

The story follows Sachin Tichkule, a struggling contractor whose failure in making peace with the corrupt bureaucracy in town as well as strained relation with his ex-girlfriend and his family leads to misadventures that deprive him of his closest relations. However, as he begins to mend his ways, justice comes knocking on his door.

Released on 23 July 2010, Khatta Meetha opened to mixed reviews and was a below-average grosser at the time of release but became a cult film.

Plot
Sachin Tichkule is a struggling Maharashtrian contractor who dreams big but has no chance of his dreams coming true as he doesn't have any money to bribe the bureaucracy. His family has lost faith in him, telling him to earn money through honest means. To make matters worse, the new Municipal Commissioner turns out to be his ex-girlfriend, Gehna Ganpule, who now hates him due to his wayward ways. His brothers-in-law Trigun Fatak, Suhas Vichare and his elder brother Harish Tichkule were all responsible for a bridge collapse resulting in many fatalities, and were helped by a politician named Sanjay Rana.

After putting the blame of the mishap on their driver Vishwas Rao, they kill him later fearing he would reveal the truth. Meanwhile, Sanjay's lustful eyes fall on Sachin's sister Anjali (Urvashi Sharma). Sachin warns him to keep away from Anjali and slaps him. Meanwhile, a journalist named Azad Bhagat wants justice as his family was killed in that accident. Anjali is betrothed to Sanjay, unbeknownst to Sachin. When he confronts his father Ramakant Tichkule as to how the marriage is finalized to an evil man without his knowledge, he reprimands Sachin, saying he has no right to say anything as he has no money to marry his sister off. After losing touch with her, Sachin learns that Anjali has been attempting to contact him, and when he goes to their house one night, he is informed by the guard that they have gone out. While returning from Sanjay's house, he sees Azad sneaking out, but is left merely suspicious.

Shortly after Sachin ends up complicating matters with Gehna when she slits her wrist in a suicide attempt upon being arrested for a fraudulent set-up on his part and is hospitalized, Sachin breaks the truth about his disillusionment with his past principles and reconciles with Gehna as well as her elder brother Madhav. A few days later he learns that Anjali died in a gas explosion. While Ramakant is devastated, Sachin is suspicious and smells foul play in her death. He then meets Azad again at the Municipal office in Gehna's presence, where he initially assumes he is a thief, but soon learns of Azad's intentions from her about how he had acquired strong evidence which would help in putting the people involved in the bridge collapse behind bars from Sanjay's house for which he sneaked into their house that day. They both then agree to help each other to reveal the corruption behind the faulty construction of the bridge.

Gehna and Azad file a case against the fraudsters. Sanjay learns of this and gets Gehna transferred to another city, later hiring masked robbers who kill Azad while he is on his way to court. Sachin takes the fatally injured Azad to the hospital for treatment. At the hospital, while Azad is dying in Sachin's arms, he reveals that while he was stealing the evidence, he saw Anjali being raped by Sanjay's friends and it's not clear whether she was murdered by her rapists while she escaped or she committed suicide. 

Vowing vengeance against Sanjay, Sachin decides to search for the documents at Azad's house but finds it missing, prompting him to enlist the help of his sidekick Rangeela in a ploy to smoke it out. Attempting to make sure the evidence isn't revealed, Sanjay decides to hide it elsewhere. Sachin follows Sanjay and spots him fleeing with the bag full of evidence, whence a fight ensues between Sanjay and Sachin. Sanjay is then killed after being run over by a truck and Sachin successfully retrieves the evidence.

Trigun, Harish and Suhas are arrested and the whole family, especially Sachin's sisters-in-law, begins belittling him, claiming he was jealous of them, blaming him for tarnishing the family name. Sachin then argues back that their husbands are still alive behind bars where the wives can see them, while the people who have died to the bridge collapse are gone forever, and nothing can be done to bring them back, and he had to deal with the pain of losing Anjali the most, considering that his brothers-in-law had a hand in her death and were not reprimanded.

He decides to leave, until Ramakant stops him and realises his honesty and trustworthiness, rekindling their relationship, saying that he is proud of him. As he gets out of the house, Sachin spots Gehna, who tells him that she remained a spinster waiting for him, and confesses her love for Sachin and they decide to marry.

Cast

Akshay Kumar as Sachin Tichkule
Trisha as Gehna Ganpule, Municipal Commissioner
Rajpal Yadav as Rangeela
Makrand Deshpande as Azad Bhagat, a social worker who lost his family in the bridge collapse
Asrani as Seth Karodimal
Johnny Lever as Award Anshuman, Girghardan Ghat
Milind Gunaji as Suhas Vichare, Sachin's brother-in-law
Aruna Irani as Sheetaladevi Tichkule, Sachin's mother
Urvashi Sharma as Anjali Tichkule, Sachin's sister
Manoj Joshi as Trigun Fatak, Sachin's brother-in-law
Kulbhushan Kharbanda as Ramakant Tichkule, Sachin's father, who is a retired judge
Tinu Anand as Vishwas Rao, driver
Atul Parchure as Chintan
Neeraj Vora as Madhav Ganpule, Gehna's elder brother
Jaideep Ahlawat as Sanjay Rane
Anupam Bhattacharya as Police Inspector
Paritosh Sand as Harish Tichkule, Sachin's elder brother
Anant Jog as Ramakant's brother-in-law
Swatantra Bharat as Mr. Adiwarkar
Preity Pundir as Sandhya Ganpule, Madhav's wife
Pooja Bhatt as Subhadra Tichkule, Harish's wife 
Esha as Akanksha Vichare, Suhas's wife and Sachin's elder sister
Geetha Vijayan as Gayatri Fatak, Trigun's wife
Ajay Shah as Ajay
Kanchan Pagare as Jadia
Sanjay Belose as Gangya
Satish as Joshi
Nitin Desai as Lawyer
Paresh Brahmabhatt as Peon
Prafull as Gopi
Nagesh Bhosle as Inspection Officer
Pradeep Vengurlekar as Vigilance Officer
Anand Ingale as Politician
Kainaat Arora as the item girl in the song "Aila Re Aila"
Amita Nangia as Geeta Bhosle

Reception

Critical response
Upon release, the film received mixed reviews from critics. 
Rajeev Masand of CNN-IBN rated the film 3 out of 5 saying, "Khatta Meetha" is a complete family film, which had its moments. Sukanya Verma of Rediff gave it 2/5 saying, "The story with its baggage of generic turns and contrived twists manages to laugh the audience at many points but all seems too familiar in making its even-now significant point. In addition, it seems a tad too long at its three hours running time.  Noyon Jyoti Parasara of AOL rated the film 1.5/5 and stated, "In no way does 'Khatta Meetha' look like a film made by a director who has made 80 films till date. Certainly not from a director who got a National Award barely a year back for 'Kanchivaram'. This one is a rather amateur product which is best avoided." Blessy Chettiar of DNA gave it a rating of 2/5 and said, "Khatta Meetha is a hotchpotch of too much drama and very little comedy". Nikhat Kazmi of the Times of India gave it the highest rating of 3.5/5 saying, "Tune off a bit for the tedious middle and you could be in for some fun and frolic in Khatta Meetha".

Awards and nominations

Soundtrack

The film's soundtrack is composed by Pritam with lyrics penned by Irshad Kamil and Nitin Raikwar, with rapper U.R.L. performing the Marathi rap on "Nana Chi Taang".

The song "Sajde Kiye" is sung by Roop Kumar Rathod and Harshdeep Kaur in the film version.

Track listing

References

External links
 
 
 
 

2010 films
Hindi remakes of Malayalam films
2010s Hindi-language films
Films scored by Shani Arshad
Films set in India
Indian satirical films
Films directed by Priyadarshan
Hari Om Entertainment films
Films featuring songs by Pritam
2010s crime comedy-drama films
Films shot in Maharashtra
Indian crime comedy-drama films
2010s satirical films